Jesper Petersen (born 25 August 1981 in Haderslev) is a Danish politician, who is a member of the Folketing for the Social Democrats political party. He is currently serving as Minister of Higher Education and Science. He was elected into parliament at the 2007 Danish general election, as a member of the Socialist People's Party. He switched party to the Social Democrats in 2013.

Political career
Petersen was first elected into parliament at the 2007 election, where he was a member of the Socialist People's Party. He was reelected in 2011, but during the term he switched party to the Social Democrats. The switch happened on 21 March 2013. He was reelected as a member of his new party in 2015 and 2019. On 16 August he became the Minister of Higher Education and Science after a minor cabinet shuffle in the Frederiksen Cabinet.

References

External links 
 Biography on the website of the Danish Parliament (Folketinget)

|-

1981 births
Living people
People from Haderslev Municipality
Education ministers of Denmark
Socialist People's Party (Denmark) politicians
Social Democrats (Denmark) politicians
Government ministers of Denmark
Members of the Folketing 2007–2011
Members of the Folketing 2011–2015
Members of the Folketing 2015–2019
Members of the Folketing 2019–2022
Members of the Folketing 2022–2026